Byalakere Shivananjappa Lingadevaru is an Indian television and film director who works in Kannada cinema. He is known for his films Naanu Avanalla...Avalu, Mouni, and Kaada Beladingalu.

Filmography
 Mouni (2003)
 Kaada Beladingalu (2007) 
 Naanu Avanalla...Avalu (2015)

Television

Awards
 won Second Best Film in 9th BIFF 2016 for Naanu Avanalla...Avalu.

References

External links
 

Living people
Kannada film directors
1967 births